Alexander Louis Jakubiak (born 27 August 1996) is a Scottish professional footballer who plays as a striker for Dundee.

Jakubiak made his sole appearance for Watford shortly before his graduation from the club's academy in the summer of 2014. Since then he has had loan spells at Braintree Town, Oxford United, Dagenham & Redbridge, Fleetwood Town, Wycombe Wanderers, Falkirk, Bristol Rovers, Gillingham and St Mirren, as well as a loan spell with Partick Thistle from Dundee. Jakubiak played twice for the Scotland under-19 team in 2014.

Club career

Watford
Having originally joined the club as an Under-15, Jakubiak signed a scholarship deal with Watford in May 2012. In his first year, Jakubiak's strike against Peterborough United's academy side won the January 2013 League Football Education Goal of the Month award.

On 11 March 2014, towards the end of his scholarship, Jakubiak was loaned to Braintree Town, joining his Watford teammate Bernard Mensah at the Conference side. His loan spell ran until 13 April, but in that time he made 11 appearances, including two starts, and scored one goal, on his debut against Wrexham. Jakubiak was subsequently involved in Watford's final three games of the 2013–14 season. He was an unused substitute in games against Derby County and Charlton Athletic before making his debut from the start in Watford's defeat at home to Huddersfield Town on 3 May 2014.

Six days after making his Watford debut, Jakubiak signed his first professional contract, a two-year deal with Watford having a further option for an additional year. Despite reporting a two-year deal in 2014, at the conclusion of the 2014–15 season Watford announced Jakubiak had signed a new one-year contract with the club. In June 2016 Watford reported they had taken up their option of a further year on Jakubiak's contract, but in August they announced that he had now signed a new four-year contract with the club.

On 23 June 2020, Watford announced that they would not be offering Jakubiak a new contract.

Professional-era loan spells
On 13 August 2014, Jakubiak moved on loan to League Two side Oxford United until 4 January 2015. He made his debut as a substitute in a 2–1 defeat to Mansfield Town on 16 August 2014. Jakubiak scored his first Oxford United goal, on his first start, in their game against Dagenham & Redbridge on 30 August 2014. After three months at the club, he was recalled by Watford on 4 November.

On 27 November 2014, he joined League Two side Dagenham & Redbridge on a one-month-long youth loan. Jakubiak scored on his debut the next day, on 28 November 2014, in a 2–0 win over Bury. His loan spell was extended on 31 January 2015. The day Jakubiak's loan spell expired, Jakubiak scored his second goal for Dagenham & Redbridge, in a 3–1 win over Cheltenham Town. After that, Jakubiak's loan spell with the club was extended further until the end of the season. Jakubiak then scored his third goal of the season, in a 3–1 loss against Burton Albion on 21 February 2015 and two months later on 18 April 2015, Jakubiak scored, in a 3–2 win over Newport County. Jakubiak made 23 appearances and scored four times for the club.

On 31 August 2016, Jakubiak joined Fleetwood Town on loan until January of the 2016–17 season. He scored his first goal for the club in an EFL Trophy tie against Carlisle United on 9 November 2016. Although he originally joined for the duration of the season, he was recalled by Watford in January 2017 after an injury crisis at the club.

On 30 January 2017, Jakubiak joined Wycombe Wanderers on loan until the end of the 2016–17 season. In January 2018, he moved on loan to Scottish Championship club Falkirk.

On 9 August 2018 Jakubiak moved on loan to League One side Bristol Rovers for the 2018–19 season. He opened his account for Bristol Rovers in an EFL Trophy tie against West Ham Under-21s on 18 September. He made 38 league appearances for the club, 26 off the bench, scoring twice. In July 2019 Jakubiak joined League One club Gillingham on a season-long loan deal. Despite leaving the club in January he ended the season as the Kent side's top goalscorer in the league with six goals.

In January 2020, Jakubiak left Gillingham, and joined Scottish Premiership side St Mirren on loan until the end of the season.

Dundee 
In August 2020, Jakubiak signed a two-year deal with Scottish Championship side Dundee. Jakubiak picked up an ankle injury in a pre-season win against Peterhead that would sideline him for several weeks. Jakubiak would make his return from injury and first competitive appearance for Dundee as a substitute against Ayr United. In December, during a league game against Inverness Caledonian Thistle, Jakubiak picked up a tendon issue in his thigh, which would leave him out of action for a few months. He would once again return to the pitch in a home win against Raith Rovers.

After achieving promotion with the club, Jakubiak would score his first competitive goal for Dundee the following season in the Scottish League Cup in July 2021. In September, Jakubiak was injured once again in bizarre fashion, suffering a dislocated shoulder during an altercation at a Dundee nightclub. The injury would require surgery, which would again leave him out of action for the remainder of the year.

On 31 January 2022, Jakubiak signed a one-year contract extension with Dundee and joined Scottish Championship side Partick Thistle on loan until the end of the season.

Jakubiak would score with his first competitive touch of the ball of the 2022–23 season for Dundee, converting from the penalty spot in a Scottish League Cup win over Hamilton Academical. He would go on to have a very successful start to the season, scoring four goals in four League Cup group stage games including a brace against Forfar Athletic. After hamstring and thigh issues respectively early in the season, Jakubiak returned to action for Dundee as a substitute in a home league victory over Ayr United in October. Jakubiak would finally score his first league goal for Dundee on 28 January 2023 as a substitute in a 3–0 win over league leaders Queen's Park, in which he also set up the opener.

International career
Born in Westminster, England, Jakubiak was monitored by Scotland national team's John Collins, over his eligibility to play for Scotland or Poland, due to his Polish ancestry.

On 22 August 2014, Jakubiak was called by the Scotland U19 squad. He made his Scotland U19 debut, where he came on as a substitute for Harry Cardwell in the 56th minute, in a 2–2 draw against Czech Republic U19.

Career statistics

References

External links
Alex Jakubiak at Soccerbase

1996 births
Living people
English footballers
English people of Polish descent
Footballers from Westminster
Association football forwards
Watford F.C. players
Braintree Town F.C. players
Oxford United F.C. players
Dagenham & Redbridge F.C. players
English Football League players
National League (English football) players
Scotland youth international footballers
Scottish people of Polish descent
English people of Scottish descent
Fleetwood Town F.C. players
Wycombe Wanderers F.C. players
Falkirk F.C. players
Bristol Rovers F.C. players
Gillingham F.C. players
Scottish Professional Football League players
St Mirren F.C. players
Dundee F.C. players
Partick Thistle F.C. players